Yvette Cauchois (19 December 1908 – 19 November 1999) was a French physicist known for her contributions to x-ray spectroscopy and x-ray optics, and for pioneering European synchrotron research.

Education 
Cauchois attended school in Paris, and pursued undergraduate studies at the Sorbonne who awarded her a degree in the physical sciences in July 1928. Cauchois undertook graduate studies at the Laboratory of Physical Chemistry with the support of a National Fund for Science studentship, and was awarded her doctorate in 1933 for her work on the use of curved crystals for high-resolution x-ray analysis.

Academic career 
After completing her doctoral studies, Cauchois was appointed research assistant in the laboratory of Jean Perrin at the Centre national de la recherche scientifique (CNRS). She was promoted to research associate in 1937, and in the same year participated in the launch of the Palais de la Découverte.

In January 1938 Cauchois was named head of the Physical Chemistry Laboratory in the Faculty of Sciences of Paris. When World War II broke out, Cauchois maintained continuity at the Laboratory, acting as Head of Studies when Jean Perrin had to flee to the United States. In 1945, when the Liberation led to the dismissal of Louis Dunoyer de Segonzac, Cauchois was promoted to Professor at the Sorbonne. She became Chair of Chemical Physics in 1954, succeeding Edmond Bauer to take charge of the laboratory.

With the number of researchers outgrowing the available space in the Laboratory, Cauchois founded the Centre de Chimie Physique at Orsay in 1960. She directed this organisation for ten years, whilst simultaneously continuing her work at the Sorbonne. She joined the University of Paris VI in 1971 following the division of the Sorbonne.

Cauchois chaired the French Society of Physical Chemistry from 1975–1978. She was only the second woman to do so, after Marie Curie. From 1978 until her retirement in 1983, Cauchois was Professor Emeritus at the University of Paris VI. Cauchois was still conducting active laboratory research as late as 1992 (aged 83). Over her lifetime she produced more than 200 publications, which continue to be cited today.

Research on x-rays and crystals 
In the early 1930s, Cauchois established the fundamental principles of a new x-ray spectrometer that was both easy to use and had a high resolution, satisfying the Bragg reflection condition. The new spectrometer was named after her, and from 1934 she used it to observe gas emissions and multiplets. The new technique was used around the world for the analysis of x-rays and gamma rays and prompted a wave of new scholarship in radiation studies. Cauchois pioneered developments in x-ray imaging and observed that x-ray radiation could be focused using curved crystal for use in monochromators and x-ray scattering. Cauchois' work on soft x-ray distributions was the first step in determining the photo-absorption spectra. She used the radiation reflected from crystals to study the electronic structure of materials.

Cauchois systematically studied the x-ray spectra of heavy elements and actinides. In 1936, Cauchois and Horia Hulubei claimed to have discovered element 85 via X-ray analysis, conducting further research and publishing on follow-up studies in 1939. With McTaggart in 1948 she determined the differential absorption of X-rays by Zirconium and Hafnium. Cauchois, Sonia Cotelle, and Hulubei proved the presence of polonium and neptunium, and Cauchois later pioneered studies on the x-ray spectra of transuranic elements.

A fascination with astrophysics led Cauchois to study extraterrestrial x-ray radiation, especially the solar x-ray spectrum using missile experiments. In 1970 she produced x-ray images of the sun.

Synchrotron and solar research 
From 1962, Cauchois initiated a research programme in collaboration with the Istituto Superiore di Sanità at the Laboratori Nazionali di Frascati to explore the possibilities of synchrotron research. She was the first person in Europe to realise the potential of the radiation emitted by electrons rotating in the synchrotron as a source for understanding the properties of matter. In the early 1970s, Cauchois carried out her experiments at LURE (Laboratoire pour l'utilisation des radiations électromagnétiques).

Personal life and death 
Cauchois was particularly interested in assisting young and underprivileged people. She also enjoyed poetry and music, and was a skilled grand piano player.
After meeting a priest from the monastery of Bârsana and discussing religious themes with him, Cauchois decided to be baptized in the Orthodox religion. She travelled to Maramures, Romania in 1999, aged 90, and was baptized there. Cauchois contracted bronchitis on this trip, and died a few days after returning to Paris. She was buried in the Monastery Bârsana, to whom she bequeathed  her assets.

Awards 
 Ancel Prize from the Société chimique de France (1933)
 Henri Becquerel Prize from the French Academy of Sciences (1935)
 Gizbal-Baral Prize (10,000 francs) from the French Academy of Sciences (1936)
 Henry de Jouvenel Prize for selfless scientific activity (10,000 francs) from the Ministry of National Education (France) (1938)
 Jerome Ponti Prize from the French Academy of Sciences (1942)
 Triossi Prize from the French Academy of Sciences (1946)
 Commander of the Order of the Ministry of Education
 Officer of the Legion of Honour
 Officer of the National Order of Merit (France)
 Medal of the Czechoslovak Society of Spectroscopy (1974)
 Fellow of The Optical Society (1974)
 Gold medal of the University of Paris (1987)
 Doctor honoris causa of the University of Bucharest (1993)
 Cauchois' name was given to a street of the new university area of Moulon in Gif-sur-Yvette and a street in Tomblaine (Meurthe-et-Moselle).

See also 
 Jean Perrin
 Horia Hulubei
 Sonia Cotelle
 Christiane Bonnelle
 Marie Curie

References 

1908 births
1999 deaths
French women physicists
Officiers of the Légion d'honneur
Scientists from Paris
Academic staff of the University of Paris
Infectious disease deaths in Romania
20th-century French physicists
20th-century French women scientists
Academic staff of Paris-Sorbonne University
Fellows of Optica (society)
Deaths from bronchitis
Women in optics